The Fieseler Fi 98 was a prototype ground-attack aircraft produced by German aircraft manufacturer Fieseler as a rival to the Henschel Hs 123.

Design and development
Fieseler developed the model in response to the Reich Air Ministry specification of 11 February 1934 calling for a robust biplane for low-level attack and dive bombing.

Three prototypes were ordered, of which one prototype was completed, and the design was rejected in favour of the Hs 123.  The design of the model, a braced-wing biplane, was essentially obsolescent.

Specifications (Fi 98)

See also

References

1930s German attack aircraft
Single-engined tractor aircraft
Biplanes
Fi 098